Lieutenant General Raymond Stallings McLain (April 4, 1890 – December 14, 1954) was a senior United States Army officer.

In the words of General George C. Marshall, Raymond S. McLain "gave great distinction to the term 'citizen soldier. His service to his state and nation spanned more than forty years.

Early life and military career
Raymond McLain was born in Washington County, Kentucky, as a son of Thomas A. and Lucetta (Stallings) McLain. He graduated from Hill's Business College in Oklahoma City in 1909 and subsequently worked as a clerk in real estate office and then worked as an abstractor. Simultaneously, he entered in the Oklahoma Army National Guard in 1912, where he attained the rank of sergeant.

In December 1914, during World War I (although the United States was still neutral at this stage), he was commissioned as an officer, with the rank of second lieutenant in the Oklahoma Army National Guard after he attended the School of Musketry at Fort Sill, Oklahoma. He was promoted again next year to the rank of first lieutenant. Following the Pancho Villa Expedition in 1916, he served on the Mexican border.

The American entry into World War I came on April 6, 1917. During the war, Raymond served as a machine gun company commander with the 36th Division on the Western Front with the American Expeditionary Force (AEF) under General John Pershing until 1919. After return home, he continued his service with the Oklahoma Army National Guard and subsequently returned to his career in business.

Between the wars
In 1938, while pursuing a career in business, McLain, rose to the rank of brigadier general in the Oklahoma National Guard and attended the U.S. Army Command and General Staff School at Fort Leavenworth, Kansas. After graduating he was posted to the 45th Infantry Division, an Oklahoma Army National Guard formation, as an assistant chief of staff.

In September 1940, he was recalled to the active duty and was appointed as the artillery commander of the 45th Infantry Division.

World War II
During World War II, he commanded the divisional artillery. He led the artillery overseas during the Allied invasion of Sicily in July–August 1943, where he earned the first of two Distinguished Service Crosses. He continued to lead the artillery in the Allied invasion of Italy in September, and in the early stages of the Italian campaign, before eventually being sent to England. His performance in these campaigns gained the respect of many of his Regular Army colleagues, such as Omar Bradley, Mark W. Clark, John P. Lucas, Troy H. Middleton, and even George S. Patton, who was normally very critical of many of his fellow senior officers. Lucas wrote about McLain, "He is an exceptionally capable field artilleryman and a very gallant soldier."

During the Battle of Normandy in August 1944, McLain briefly took command of the 90th Infantry Division, which was having numerous command problems. McLain transformed the 90th into a first-class fighting formation, and led it across France in the Allied advance from Paris to the Rhine and in many numerous battles on the Western Front. In October he then assumed command of the XIX Corps, remaining its commander for the rest of the war. He was the only National Guardsman to command a corps in combat during World War II.

Postwar
For his distinguished service in the war, he was appointed a brigadier general in the Regular Army. Later, he became the comptroller of the army, and was appointed the army's first statutory comptroller general. At the time of his death in 1954 he was serving on President Dwight D. Eisenhower's National Security Training Commission.

He died at Walter Reed General Hospital in Washington, D.C. on December 14, 1954, at the age of 64.

Honors
Tulsa Public High School Named is his honor.
For the service and performance exhibited by McLain in his military career, the Tulsa Public Schools built and honored General McLain, by opening McLain High School, in September, 1959. In the years that followed its opening, many relatives, friends and descendants of General McLain attended school assemblies and honored him. After almost 50 years of graduating many young adults who have achieved similar excellence in their own lives from McLain, today McLain High School now serves the community in an occupational job program role.

On May 22 & 23, 2009, the McLain High School graduates of the first three classes came together for a joint class reunion and honored General McLain and the schools' 50th birthday.

Decorations

Lieutenant General McLain's decorations include: Distinguished Service Cross with Oak leaf Cluster (Sicily, 1943 and France, 1944), Army Distinguished Service Medal with Oak leaf Cluster (France, 1944 and Germany, 1945), Silver Star (Italy, 1943), Legion of Merit, Bronze Star with Oak leaf Cluster (Italy, 1944 and Germany, 1945), Mexican Border Service Medal, World War I Victory Medal with two battle clasps, American Defense Service Medal, American Campaign Medal, European-African-Middle Eastern Campaign Medal with one silver and three bronze service stars and Arrowhead device, World War II Victory Medal, Army of Occupation Medal, Chevalier of the Legion of Honor, French Croix de Guerre 1939–1945, Grand officer of the Order of Orange-Nassau with swords, Commander of the Order of Leopold II and Belgian Croix de Guerre.

Lieutenant General McLain's ribbon bar:

Bibliography

References

External links

Army.mil: Raymond S. McLain
Generals of World War II
United States Army Officers 1939–1945

|-

United States Army generals
1890 births
1954 deaths
People from Washington County, Kentucky
United States Army Command and General Staff College alumni
United States Army personnel of World War I
National Guard (United States) generals
Recipients of the Distinguished Service Cross (United States)
Recipients of the Distinguished Service Medal (US Army)
Recipients of the Silver Star
Recipients of the Legion of Merit
Chevaliers of the Légion d'honneur
Recipients of the Croix de Guerre 1939–1945 (France)
Grand Officers of the Order of Orange-Nassau
Commanders of the Order of Leopold II
Recipients of the Croix de guerre (Belgium)
United States Army generals of World War II